In mathematics, the Mertens conjecture is the statement that the Mertens function  is bounded by . Although now disproven, it had been shown to imply the Riemann hypothesis.
It is a striking example of a mathematical conjecture proven false despite a large amount of computational evidence in its favor.

Definition 

In number theory, we define the Mertens function as

 

where μ(k) is the Möbius function; the Mertens conjecture is that for all n > 1,

Disproof of the conjecture 
Stieltjes claimed in 1885 to have proven a weaker result, namely that  was bounded, but did not publish a proof.

In 1985, Andrew Odlyzko and Herman te Riele proved the Mertens conjecture false using the Lenstra–Lenstra–Lovász lattice basis reduction algorithm:
   and  
It was later shown that the first counterexample appears below  but above 1016.

In 2016, Hurst made further improvements by showing
   and

Connection to the Riemann hypothesis 

The connection to the Riemann hypothesis is based on the Dirichlet series
for the reciprocal of the Riemann zeta function,

valid in the region . We can rewrite this as a 
Stieltjes integral

and after integrating by parts, obtain the reciprocal of the zeta function
as a Mellin transform

From this, the Mellin transform integral must be convergent, and hence
From this it follows that 

for all positive  is equivalent to the Riemann hypothesis, which therefore would have followed from the stronger Mertens hypothesis, and follows from the hypothesis of Stieltjes that

References

Further reading

External links 
 

Analytic number theory
Disproved conjectures